Helle is a genus of small-headed flies. It is endemic to New Zealand. The genus is named after Helle, the daughter of Athamas, from Greek mythology.

Species
 Helle longirostris (Hudson, 1892)
 Helle rufescens Brunetti, 1926

References

Acroceridae
Nemestrinoidea genera
Diptera of New Zealand
Taxa named by Carl Robert Osten-Sacken
Endemic insects of New Zealand